Danylo Chufarov is a paralympic swimmer from Ukraine competing mainly in category S13 events.

Chufarov was part of the Ukrainian team that travelled to Beijing for the 2008 Summer Paralympics where he competed in five events.  He missed the final of the 50m freestyle by one place, finished fourth in the 100m butterfly, fourth in the 200m individual medley, he won bronze in the 100m freestyle and finished second in the 400m freestyle behind the world record set by South Africa's Charl Bouwer.

Personal life
Chufarov was born on 15 July 1989 in Mariupol, and is married to Yaryna.

References

External links
 

Living people
Ukrainian male backstroke swimmers
Ukrainian male butterfly swimmers
Ukrainian male freestyle swimmers
Ukrainian male medley swimmers
S13-classified Paralympic swimmers
Paralympic swimmers of Ukraine
Paralympic silver medalists for Ukraine
Paralympic bronze medalists for Ukraine
Swimmers at the 2008 Summer Paralympics
Swimmers at the 2012 Summer Paralympics
Medalists at the 2008 Summer Paralympics
Medalists at the 2012 Summer Paralympics
Medalists at the World Para Swimming European Championships
Year of birth missing (living people)
Paralympic medalists in swimming
Laureates of the Honorary Diploma of the Verkhovna Rada of Ukraine
Recipients of the Honorary Diploma of the Cabinet of Ministers of Ukraine
21st-century Ukrainian people